Malta competed for the first time as an independent country at the 1968 Summer Olympics in Mexico City, Mexico. The nation returned to the Olympic Games after missing the 1964 Summer Olympics. A single male competitor took part in one event in one sport.

Shooting

Skeet
 Joseph Grech

See also
 Malta at the 1968 Summer Paralympics

References

External links
Official Olympic Reports

Nations at the 1968 Summer Olympics
1968
1968 in Maltese sport